Chandrakanta Goyal (1932 – June 6, 2020) was a Bharatiya Janata Party politician. She was a member of Maharashtra Legislative Assembly from Matunga constituency three times, winning in 1990, 1995, and 1999. She was married to Ved Prakash Goyal (1926–2008) who was a minister in Atal Bihari Vajpayee's government. Their son, Piyush Goyal, is a minister in Modi ministry.

Chandrakanta Goyal died in June 2020, at the age of 88.

References

1932 births
2020 deaths
Bharatiya Janata Party politicians from Maharashtra
Women members of the Maharashtra Legislative Assembly
Politicians from Mumbai
20th-century Indian women politicians
20th-century Indian politicians
21st-century Indian women politicians
21st-century Indian politicians
Maharashtra MLAs 1990–1995
Maharashtra MLAs 1999–2004